Ville-Marie may refer to:

Places
Ville-Marie, Quebec, Canada; a town in Abitibi-Témiscamingue
Montreal, Quebec, Canada; from its former, original, name
Fort Ville-Marie, the original name for the settlement that later became Montreal, Quebec, Canada
Ville-Marie, Montreal, a borough of the city of Montreal, Quebec, Canada
Autoroute Ville-Marie (A-720/R-136 highway), a freeway in Montreal, Quebec, Canada
Ville-Marie Tunnel, the underground portion of the Ville-Marie Expressway

Other uses
Ville-Marie (film), a 2015 French-Canadian film
Radio Ville-Marie (CIRA-FM 91.3 FM), a radio station

See also 

Ville-Marie borough council
Parti Montréal Ville-Marie, a municipal political party
Place Ville-Marie, Montreal, Quebec, Canada; a business tower complex
Ville-Marie—Le Sud-Ouest—Île-des-Sœurs, Quebec, Canada; a federal riding
Westmount--Ville-Marie, Quebec, Canada; a federal riding

Ville (disambiguation)
Marie (disambiguation)
 Villa Maria (disambiguation)
 Vila Maria (disambiguation)
 Maryville (disambiguation)